Harwood is a suburb to the north-northeast of Bolton, Greater Manchester, bordering Bury in North West England. Harwood is also part of the historic county of Lancashire.

History
The township was recorded as Harewode in 1212 and 1302. The manor which included Bradshaw, was part of the Manchester fee held by the Grelleys in the Middle Ages. In 1212 it was divided, the parts held by Roger de Samlesbury and Alexander de Harwood. The Samlesbury portion descended in the same way as Breightmet and the Harwood portion to the Traffords of Trafford who sold it in 1589 and afterwards much divided. The Radcliffes and Bartons of Smithills Hall held land in Harwood for many generations and Adam Mort of Astley held a messuage and a fulling mill in 1630. In 1612, Sir Nicholas Mosley and his son, Edward, conveyed the manor of Harwood to a partnership of five yeomen; Matthew Harrison, Henry Haworth, Raufe Higson, Lawrence Horrocks and Edward Greenhalgh. In the Hearth tax returns of 1666, forty-two hearths were liable to tax but only one house had three hearths. The common lands were enclosed in 1801. Christ Church was built in 1840 and Wesleyan and Primitive Methodist chapels were also built.

Governance
Lying within the boundaries of the historic county of Lancashire since the early 12th century, Harwood was a township in the ecclesiastical parish of Bolton le Moors in the Hundred of Salford. In 1837 it became part of the Bolton Poor Law Union which took responsibility for funding the Poor Law in that area and in 1898 it became part of Turton Urban District.

Geography
Harwood is 2½ miles north east of Bolton in the West Pennine Moors to the north of the road to Bury. Bradshaw Brook separates it from Tonge. Stone was quarried and the brooks used by bleachworks. The underlying rocks are coal measures, sandstones and shales.

Originally a small village within the former Turton Urban District, but now a small part of the Metropolitan Borough of Bolton. Harwood is mostly residential, with most businesses and shops concentrated around a Morrisons supermarket at its centre. Neighbouring districts include Affetside, Bradshaw and Breightmet.

Harwood is picturesque with St Maxentius church at its Bolton facing end, with historic tower. There are several public houses; (House Without a Name, Seven Stars,Grey Mare, Bill'n'Coos, Crofters and the White Horse) many serving food, a medical practice,library, large park (Longsight Park also containing Bolton arboretum) and a small playground off Recreation Street. Numerous footpaths leading out to the West Pennine Hills.

Transport
Harwood is served by the 507 bus from Bolton. On Monday to Saturday weekdays, the 480 runs hourly running between Bolton and Bury, via Bradshaw, Harwood, Affetside and Tottington. The nearest railway stations are located at Hall i' th' Wood within walking distance on the main road and Bromley Cross within the public footpaths in Bradshaw.

Education
Primary schools in the area are St Brendan's, St Maxentius, Harwood Meadows, Hardy Mill. The popular secondary school for residents of Harwood is Turton High School in Bromley Cross, though both Canon Slade and Bolton St Catherine's Academy are nearby.

See also

Listed buildings in South Turton

References

External links
 Information about Harwood
 GENUKI: Harwood, Lancashire genealogy
 Extract from Harwood: The Early Years, by J. Frederick Horridge

Areas of Bolton